The Norfolk Admirals were a professional ice hockey team that played in the American Hockey League. They became affiliated with the Anaheim Ducks after being dropped from the Tampa Bay Lightning following their 2012 AHL championship season. The Admirals played in Norfolk, Virginia at the Norfolk Scope.

For the 2015–16 season, the Admirals moved to San Diego, California to become the newest version of the San Diego Gulls as part of the AHL's efforts to create a Pacific Division. The Bakersfield Condors from the ECHL moved to Norfolk for the 2015–16 season and also use the name Norfolk Admirals.

History
The market was previously home to: 
 Tidewater Wings (1971–1972 AHL)
 Virginia Wings (1972–1975 AHL)
 Hampton Gulls (1974–1977 SHL, 1977–1978 AHL)
 Hampton Aces (1978–1981 NEHL)
 Hampton Roads Gulls (1982–1983 ACHL)
 Hampton Roads Admirals (1989–2000 ECHL)

The original team ownership, Mark Garcea and Page Johnson (owners of the Hampton Roads Admirals franchise in the East Coast Hockey League), sought and gained admission to the American Hockey League as an expansion franchise for the 2000–01 season with an affiliation agreement with the Chicago Blackhawks. On May 26, 2004, the franchise was purchased by Ken Young after the original owners had put it up for sale. The team name pays homage to the area's long naval history.

Norfolk was one of two franchises in the AHL named the Admirals, sharing the nickname with the Milwaukee Admirals. The Milwaukee franchise transferred from the defunct International Hockey League, and were allowed to keep their previous moniker.

Norfolk's geographically closest rivals were the Hershey Bears, Charlotte Checkers, and Wilkes-Barre/Scranton Penguins. The Admirals had two mascots, a dog named Salty and a rabbit named Hat Trick.

On March 19, 2007, the Blackhawks announced that their affiliation with the Admirals would end after the 2006–07 season. On March 29, 2007, the Tampa Bay Lightning officially announced the Admirals as their new affiliate.  On June 14, 2012 Tampa Bay announced their separation from the 2012 Calder Cup champions in favor of the Syracuse Crunch.  Later in that month owner Ken Young announced he had closed a five-year agreement with the Anaheim Ducks.

2011–12 season
During the 2011–12 season, the Norfolk Admirals, coached by Jon Cooper, set a professional hockey record for the longest winning streak, winning their 28th consecutive game on April 15 against the Adirondack Phantoms. The streak far surpassed the previous AHL record of 17 straight wins set by the Philadelphia Phantoms in 2004–05, as well as the pro hockey record of 18 games set by the Peoria Rivermen of the original International Hockey League in 1991.

The streak garnered international media attention for the Admirals and the American Hockey League, including highlights on NHL Network and ESPN's SportsCenter.

The 28-game streak included 15 home games and 13 road games. The win streak started on February 10 against Adirondack. Before their 3-2 OT win against Binghamton on April 14, the previous 20 games were all won in regulation. As of October 20, 2012, the Admirals had won 32 regular season games in a row dating back to the 2011–12 season.

The winning streak translated into a deep playoff run for the Admirals, where they would win 15 of 18 playoff games, including back to back four game sweeps in the Eastern Conference and Calder Cup Finals. On June 9, 2012, the Admirals captured their first ever Calder Cup with a 6–1 win over the Toronto Marlies.

Prior to the 2012–13 season, the Admirals and the Syracuse Crunch parent NHL organizations swapped teams. As a result, the Admirals failed to qualify for the Calder Cup playoffs while the Crunch made it to the Calder Cup Finals.

Relocation
On January 6, 2015, it was announced that the Admirals would move to an unknown location on the west coast, likely close to their NHL affiliate, after the franchise was purchased by the Anaheim Ducks. On January 29, 2015, the Ducks confirmed the Admirals' relocation to San Diego to become the newest incarnation of the San Diego Gulls. The Admirals were replaced in Norfolk with the relocated Bakersfield Condors franchise of the ECHL. The new team retained the Admirals name and logo but were affiliated with the Edmonton Oilers.

Players

Team Captains
Aaron Downey, 2000–2001
Ajay Baines, 2002–2006
Craig MacDonald, 2006–2007
Dan Jancevski, 2007–2008
Zenon Konopka, 2008–2009
Ryan Craig, 2009–2010
Chris Durno, 2010–2011
Mike Angelidis, 2011–2012
Nate Guenin, 2012–2013
Garnet Exelby, 2013–2014
Dave Steckel, 2014–2015

Notable alumni
NHL alumni of the Norfolk Admirals include:

2010 Stanley Cup Finals
In the 2010 Stanley Cup Finals, sixteen former Admirals competed for the championship. Bryan Bickell, Dave Bolland, Troy Brouwer, Adam Burish, Dustin Byfuglien, Corey Crawford, Jake Dowell, Colin Fraser, Jordan Hendry, Duncan Keith, Danny Richmond, Brent Seabrook, Jack Skille, and Kris Versteeg were on the Chicago Blackhawks active roster. Michael Leighton and Lukas Krajicek played for the Philadelphia Flyers.

Team records

Season-by-season results

Single-season records
Goals: Troy Brouwer, 41 (2006–07)
Assists: Martin St. Pierre, 72 (2006–07)
Points: Martin St. Pierre, 99 (2006–07)
Penalty minutes: Zack Stortini, 299 (2013- 2014)
Wins: Corey Crawford, 38 (2006–07)
GAA: Craig Anderson, 1.94 (2002–03)
SV%: Craig Anderson, .923 (2002–03)

Career records
Career goals: Brandon Bochenski, 81
Career assists: Marty Wilford, 141
Career points: Blair Jones, 185
Career penalty minutes: Shawn Thornton, 1198
Career goaltending wins: Dustin Tokarski, 80
Career shutouts: Michael Leighton, 18
Career games: Ajay Baines, 409

References

External links
Norfolk Admirals official website
PilotOnline.com
The Internet Hockey Database - Norfolk Admirals
The Voice of the Fans since 1997

Ice hockey teams in Virginia
 
Ice hockey clubs established in 2000
Ice hockey clubs disestablished in 2015
Anaheim Ducks minor league affiliates
2000 establishments in Virginia
2015 disestablishments in Virginia
Sports in Norfolk, Virginia
Chicago Blackhawks minor league affiliates
Tampa Bay Lightning minor league affiliates